Pyrgospira tampaensis, common name the Tampa turrid, is a species of small to medium-sized sea snail, a marine gastropod mollusk in the family Pseudomelatomidae.

Description
The size of the shell of this species varies between 10 mm and 32 mm.

Distribution
This species occurs in the Caribbean Sea and in the Gulf of Mexico; in the Atlantic Ocean from North Carolina, USA, to Northern Brasil; fossils have been found in Quaternary strata in Florida, USA, age range: 2.588 to 0.012 Ma.

References

 Bartsch, Paul, and Harald A. Rehder. "New turritid mollusks from Florida." Proceedings of the United States National Museum (1939)
 Rosenberg, G.; Moretzsohn, F.; García, E. F. (2009). Gastropoda (Mollusca) of the Gulf of Mexico, Pp. 579–699 in: Felder, D.L. and D.K. Camp (eds.), Gulf of Mexico–Origins, Waters, and Biota. Texas A&M Press, College Station, Texas
 A. J. W. Hendy, D. P. Buick, K. V. Bulinski, C. A. Ferguson, and A. I. Miller. 2008. Unpublished census data from Atlantic coastal plain and circum-Caribbean Neogene assemblages and taxonomic opinions

External links
 
 

tampaensis
Gastropods described in 1939